Lubick is a surname. Notable people with the surname include:

Donald Cyril Lubick (1926-2022), American lawyer
Marc Lubick (born 1977), American football coach
Matt Lubick (born 1972), American football coach
Sonny Lubick (born 1937), former American football coach